The golf competition at the 2018 Central American and Caribbean Games was held in Barranquilla, Colombia from 30 July to 2 August at the Cancha Del Country Club.

Medal summary

Medal table

References

External links
2018 Central American and Caribbean Games – Golf

2018 Central American and Caribbean Games events
Central American and Caribbean Games
2018
Central American and Caribbean Games